Polycerates (meaning "many-horned") are animals with more than two horns.

Sheep
Polycerate sheep breeds include the Hebridean, Icelandic, Jacob, Manx Loaghtan, Boreray and the Navajo-Churro. One example of a polycerate Shetland sheep was a ram kept by US President Thomas Jefferson for several years in the early 19th century in front of the White House. In the spring of 1808 this ram attacked several people who had taken shortcuts across the square, injuring some and actually killing a small boy. Because of selective breeding, polycerate sheep are increasingly rare in the British Isles and Spain, but some breeds can still be found in Asia. One example is the black-faced sheep of Tibet.

Goats
There have been incidents of polycerate goats (having as many as eight horns), although this is a genetic rarity thought to be inherited. The horns are most typically removed in commercial dairy goat herds, to reduce the injuries to humans and other goats.

4 horns are the norm for the Austrian goat breed Vierhornziege (four-horned goat).

Wildlife

Antelopes also can be polycerate, for example, the blue wildebeest (Connochaetes taurinus). Both sexes normally possess one pair of large curved horns.

Mythology
Cerastes, a legendary Greek horned serpent, is sometimes described with two horns or with four small ones.

References

Animal anatomy
Even-toed ungulates